Ante Žanetić (18 November 1936 – 18 December 2014) was a Croatian professional footballer.

Club career
During his club career he played for NK Hajduk Split, Club Brugge K.V. and Racing White.

Žanetić later decided to leave Yugoslavia in order to play football in west Europe. He abandoned the Hajduk Split squad while the team was in Germany in 1961 and moved to Belgium where he played for Club Brugge K.V. and Racing White. He subsequently emigrated to Australia. He died there in 2014.

International career
He earned 15 caps for the Yugoslavia national football team, and participated in the 1960 European Nations' Cup and on the Yugoslavian team that won the 1960 Olympics. He also played a friendly match for the PR Croatian national team against Indonesia. His final international was a September 1960 Olympic Games match against Denmark.

References

External links
 
 For infobox club stats: 

1936 births
2014 deaths
People from Korčula
Croatian emigrants to Australia
Association football defenders
Croatian footballers
Croatia international footballers
Yugoslav footballers
Yugoslavia international footballers
Olympic footballers of Yugoslavia
Footballers at the 1960 Summer Olympics
Olympic gold medalists for Yugoslavia
Olympic medalists in football
Medalists at the 1960 Summer Olympics
1960 European Nations' Cup players
Dual internationalists (football)
NK GOŠK Dubrovnik players
HNK Hajduk Split players
Club Brugge KV players
R.W.D. Molenbeek players
Yugoslav First League players
Belgian Pro League players
Yugoslav expatriate footballers
Expatriate footballers in Belgium
Yugoslav expatriate sportspeople in Belgium
Yugoslav defectors
Croatian football managers
Sydney United 58 FC managers